PLGA is poly(lactic-co-glycolic acid), a copolymer.

PLGA may also refer to:

 People's Liberation Guerrilla Army (India), the armed wing of the Communist Party of India (Maoist)
 Plastic land grid array, a type of surface-mount packaging for integrated circuits
 Polymorphous low-grade adenocarcinoma, a malignant salivary gland tumor

See also
 LGA (disambiguation)